Teluk Dalam (also written as Telukdalam) is a town and district in the South Nias Regency, North Sumatra province, Indonesia. Following the splitting off of parts of the original district to form new districts, it is now mainly confined to the town, and its area is now . In English, Teluk Dalam means "Deep Bay". As of mid 2021, Telukdalam had a population of 25,780 and a population density of 624.2/km2. Telukdalam has various tourist sites, such as Sorake Beach, Lagundri Beach and Bawömataluo which hosts Nias traditional houses of hundred years ago.

History

Telukdalam port came about after the original port in the south of Nias Island was in Teluk Lagundri (Lagundri Bay), further to the west along Nias's south coast. In 1883, the resulting tsunami from the Krakatau volcano in the Sunda Strait between Sumatra and Java washed the original Teluk Lagundri trade village away. The trade village was moved to the present position in Teluk Dalam.

On 28 March 2005, the 2005 Nias–Simeulue earthquake destroyed many ancient sites and many people were killed. On 2 April 2005, an Australian Sea King helicopter carrying 11 soldiers on a humanitarian mission to help the earthquake victims crashed there, killing nine soldiers.

Climate
Teluk Dalam has a tropical rainforest climate (Af) with heavy to very heavy rainfall year-round.

References

External links
Tourist sites in Teluk Dalam

Populated places in North Sumatra
Regency seats of North Sumatra
Districts of North Sumatra